Sri Lankan women's cricket team toured India in February 2016. The tour included a series of 3 One Day Internationals and 3 Twenty20 internationals. The ODIs were part of the 2014–16 ICC Women's Championship. India won both series by 3–0.

Squads

WODI series

1st WODI

2nd WODI

3rd WODI

WT20I series

1st T20I

2nd T20I

3rd  T20I

See also 
 India Women's tour of Australia 
 2014–16 ICC Women's Championship

References

External links 
Series home on ESPNCricinfo

 

Sri Lanka 2016
India 2016
2014–16 ICC Women's Championship
2015–16 Indian women's cricket
2016 in Sri Lankan cricket
2016 in women's cricket